In physics, the Josephson effect is a phenomenon that occurs when two superconductors are placed in proximity, with some barrier or restriction between them. It is an example of a macroscopic quantum phenomenon, where the effects of quantum mechanics are observable at ordinary, rather than atomic, scale. The Josephson effect has many practical applications because it exhibits a precise relationship between different physics quantities, such as voltage and frequency, facilitating highly accurate measurements.

The Josephson effect produces a current, known as a supercurrent, that flows continuously without any voltage applied, across a device known as a Josephson junction (JJ). These consist of two or more superconductors coupled by a weak link. The weak link can be a thin insulating barrier (known as a superconductor–insulator–superconductor junction, or S-I-S), a short section of non-superconducting metal (S-N-S), or a physical constriction that weakens the superconductivity at the point of contact (S-c-S).

Josephson junctions have important applications in quantum-mechanical circuits, such as SQUIDs, superconducting qubits, and RSFQ digital electronics. The NIST standard for one volt is achieved by an array of 20,208 Josephson junctions in series.

History
The Josephson effect is named after the British physicist Brian David Josephson, who predicted in 1962 the mathematical relationships for the current and voltage across the weak link. The DC Josephson effect had been seen in experiments prior to 1962, but had been attributed to "super-shorts" or breaches in the insulating barrier leading to the direct conduction of electrons between the superconductors. The first paper to claim the discovery of Josephson's effect, and to make the requisite experimental checks, was that of Philip Anderson and John Rowell. These authors were awarded  patents on the effects that were never enforced, but never challenged. 

Before Josephson's prediction, it was only known that single (i.e. non-paired) electrons can flow through an insulating barrier, by means of quantum tunneling. Josephson was the first to predict the tunneling of superconducting Cooper pairs. For this work, Josephson received the Nobel Prize in Physics in 1973.

Applications 
 Types of Josephson junction include the φ Josephson junction (of which π Josephson junction is a special example), long Josephson junction, and superconducting tunnel junction.  A "Dayem bridge" is a thin-film variant of the Josephson junction in which the weak link consists of a superconducting wire with dimensions on the scale of a few micrometres or less. The Josephson junction count of a device is used as a benchmark for its complexity. The Josephson effect has found wide usage, for example in the following areas.

SQUIDs, or superconducting quantum interference devices, are very sensitive magnetometers that operate via the Josephson effect. They are widely used in science and engineering.

In precision metrology, the Josephson effect provides an exactly reproducible conversion between frequency and voltage. Since the frequency is already defined precisely and practically by the caesium standard, the Josephson effect is used, for most practical purposes, to give the standard representation of a volt, the Josephson voltage standard.

Single-electron transistors are often constructed of superconducting materials, allowing use to be made of the Josephson effect to achieve novel effects. The resulting device is called a "superconducting single-electron transistor".

The Josephson effect is also used for the most precise measurements of elementary charge in terms of the Josephson constant and von Klitzing constant which is related to the quantum Hall effect.

RSFQ digital electronics is based on shunted Josephson junctions. In this case, the junction switching event is associated to the emission of one magnetic flux quantum  that carries the digital information: the absence of switching is equivalent to 0, while one switching event carries a 1.

Josephson junctions are integral in superconducting quantum computing as qubits such as in a flux qubit or others schemes where the phase and charge act as the conjugate variables.

Superconducting tunnel junction detectors (STJs) may become a viable replacement for CCDs (charge-coupled devices) for use in astronomy and astrophysics in a few years. These devices are effective across a wide spectrum from ultraviolet to infrared, and also in x-rays. The technology has been tried out on the William Herschel Telescope in the SCAM instrument.

Quiterons and similar superconducting switching devices.

Josephson effect has also been observed in superfluid helium quantum interference devices (SHeQUIDs), the superfluid helium analog of a dc-SQUID.

The Josephson equations

The Josephson effect can be calculated using the laws of quantum mechanics. A diagram of a single Josephson junction is shown at right. Assume that superconductor A has Ginzburg–Landau order parameter , and superconductor B , which can be interpreted as the wave functions of Cooper pairs in the two superconductors. The Schrödinger equation for this two-state quantum system is therefore:

where the constant  is a characteristic of the junction. To solve the above equation, first calculate the time derivative of the order parameter in superconductor A:

and therefore the Schrödinger equation gives:

The phase difference of Ginzburg-Landau order parameters across the junction is called the Josephson phase:

The Schrödinger equation can therefore be rewritten as:

and its complex conjugate equation is:

Add the two conjugate equations together to eliminate :

Since , we have:

Now, subtract the two conjugate equations to eliminate :

which gives:

Similarly, for superconductor B we can derive that:

Equation (1) is called the first Josephson relation or weak-link current-phase relation, and equation (2) is called the second Josephson relation or superconducting phase evolution equation. The critical current of the Josephson junction depends on the properties of the superconductors, and can also be affected by environmental factors like temperature and externally applied magnetic field.

The Josephson constant is defined as:

and its inverse is the magnetic flux quantum:

The superconducting phase evolution equation can be reexpressed as:

If we define:

then the voltage across the junction is:

which is very similar to Faraday's law of induction. But note that this voltage does not come from magnetic energy, since there is no magnetic field in the superconductors; Instead, this voltage comes from the kinetic energy of the carriers (i.e. the Cooper pairs). This phenomenon is also known as kinetic inductance.

Three main effects 

There are three main effects predicted by Josephson that follow directly from the Josephson equations:

The DC Josephson effect
The DC Josephson effect is a direct current crossing the insulator in the absence of any external electromagnetic field, owing to tunneling.

The AC Josephson effect
This means a Josephson junction can act as a perfect voltage-to-frequency converter.

The inverse AC Josephson effect
Microwave radiation of a single (angular) frequency  can induce quantized DC voltages across the Josephson junction, in which case the Josephson phase takes the form , and the voltage and current across the junction will be:

The DC components are:

This means a Josephson junction can act like a perfect frequency-to-voltage converter, which is the theoretical basis for the Josephson voltage standard.

Josephson inductance 
When the current and Josephson phase varies over time, the voltage drop across the junction will also vary accordingly; As shown in derivation below, the Josephson relations determine that this behavior can be modeled by a kinetic inductance named Josephson Inductance.

Rewrite the Josephson relations as:

Now, apply the chain rule to calculate the time derivative of the current:

Rearrange the above result in the form of the current–voltage characteristic of an inductor:

This gives the expression for the kinetic inductance as a function of the Josephson Phase:

Here,  is a characteristic parameter of the Josephson junction, named the Josephson Inductance.

Note that although the kinetic behavior of the Josephson junction is similar to that of an inductor, there is no associated magnetic field. This behaviour is derived from the kinetic energy of the charge carriers, instead of the energy in a magnetic field.

Josephson energy
Based on the similarity of the Josephson junction to a non-linear inductor, the energy stored in a Josephson junction when a supercurrent flows through it can be calculated.

The supercurrent flowing through the junction is related to the Josephson phase by the current-phase relation (CPR):

The superconducting phase evolution equation is analogous to Faraday's law:

The energy increase in the junction is equal to the work done on the junction:

This shows that the change of energy in the Josephson junction depends only on the initial and final state of the junction and not the path. Therefore the energy stored in a Josephson junction is a state function, which can be defined as:

Here  is a characteristic parameter of the Josephson junction, named the Josephson Energy. An alternative but equivalent definition  is also often used.

Again, note that a non-linear magnetic coil inductor accumulates potential energy in its magnetic field when a current passes through it; However, in the case of Josephson junction, no magnetic field is created by a supercurrent — the stored energy comes from the kinetic energy of the charge carriers instead.

The RCSJ model 
The Resistively Capacitance Shunted Junction (RCSJ) model, or simply shunted junction model, includes the effect of AC impedance of an actual Josephson junction on top of the two basic Josephson relations stated above.

As per Thévenin's theorem, the AC impedance of the junction can be represented by a capacitor and a shunt resistor, both parallel to the ideal Josephson Junction. The complete expression for the current drive  becomes:

where the first term is displacement current with  -  effective capacitance, and the third is normal current with   - effective resistance of the junction.

Josephson penetration depth

The Josephson penetration depth characterizes the typical length on which an externally applied magnetic field penetrates into the long Josephson junction.

where  is the magnetic flux quantum,  is the critical supercurrent density (A/m2), and  characterizes the inductance of the superconducting electrodes

The Josephson penetration depth usually ranges from a few μm to several mm if the critical supercurrent density is very low.

See also

Pi Josephson junction
φ Josephson junction
Josephson diode
Andreev reflection
Fractional vortices
Ginzburg–Landau theory
Macroscopic quantum phenomena
Macroscopic quantum self-trapping
Quantum computer
Quantum gyroscope
Rapid single flux quantum (RSFQ)
Semifluxon
Zero-point energy
Josephson vortex

References 

 
Condensed matter physics
Superconductivity
Sensors
Mesoscopic physics
Energy (physics)